Yuri Nikolayevich Merzlyakov (born 9 April 1949) is a Russian diplomat, who was one of the 3 co-chairmen of the OSCE Minsk Group.

Yuri Merzlyakov graduated from MGIMO in 1971 and Diplomatic Academy of the USSR Ministry of Foreign Affairs in 1979, and worked at various positions in the central offices of the Soviet and Russian Ministries of Foreign Affairs and diplomatic missions abroad. In 1998-1999 he held the position of the special envoy at the Russian Ministry of Foreign Affairs and the head of the Working Group on the Caspian Sea.

Yuri Merzlyakov has a rank of the 1st class Ambassador Extraordinary and Plenipotentiary, speaks English, French and Swahili. He is married and has a daughter.

Yuri Merzlyakov was appointed on 19 July 2010 by the Russian President Dimitri Medvedev as the new Russian ambassador to Estonia, replacing his colleague .

References 

 Biography
 Medvedev Appoints Yuri Merzlyakov as New Russia’s Ambassador in Estonia

Living people
1949 births
Moscow State Institute of International Relations alumni
Diplomatic Academy of the Ministry of Foreign Affairs of the Russian Federation alumni
Soviet diplomats
Ambassador Extraordinary and Plenipotentiary (Russian Federation)
Ambassadors of Russia to Estonia
Ambassadors of Russia to Kazakhstan
Ambassadors of Russia to Madagascar
Ambassadors of Russia to the Comoros